Danish national road 15 is a road in Denmark, starting at Grenå and ending at Søndervig. Part of it is motorway quality.

Motorway Section

 Largest roundabout in Denmark

 Århus Vest 
 21 Harlev 
 22 Skovby 
 23 Galten
 24 Låsby 
| Kalbygård Skov 
 26 Hårup 
 27 Silkeborg Ø 
 28 Søholt  
 29 Høje Kejlstrup 
 30 Silkeborg N  
 33 Funder  
 35 Pårup 
| Rønkilde
 36 Bording
 37 Ikast Ø 
 38 Ikast C
 39 HI-Park
 40 Hammerum
 Herning 
 Herning Syd 
 41 Lind 
 42 Herning V 
 43 Herning SV  (planning)

Expressway begins
Studsgård 
Expressway ends 

Roads in Denmark